Kim Do-hyuk (born 8 February 1992) is a South Korean footballer who plays for Incheon United.

In 2018 he joined Asan Mugunghwa on loan for his military service.

References

External links 
 

1992 births
Living people
South Korean footballers
K League 1 players
Incheon United FC players
Association football midfielders